Brownell Car Company was a horsecar and streetcar builder in St. Louis, Missouri.

The company was founded as Brownell and Wight Car Company by Frederick Brownell and Andrew Wight in 1875 as a horsecar builder, and was renamed in 1879.

It produced electric cars after horsecar service was abandoned by many cities. The company was bought by J. G. Brill and Company in 1902, either directly or through their American Car Company subsidiary.

Product
 Horsecars
 SE ST streetcar
 Cable cars - Chicago, Brooklyn, New York, Kansas City
 Low's Adjustable Car
 Accelerator Car
 Open bench electric street cars
 Combination cars
 Rail grinder cars

Clients
 Montreal Street Railway
 Baltimore Traction Company - open bench streetcars
 Grand Avenue Railway - Kansas City - cable cars
 Chicago City Railway - Chicago - cable cars
 Brooklyn Avenue Railway - cable cars
 Salem, Oregon Salem Street Railway Company - horsecars
 St. Louis Public Service Company

See also
St. Louis Car Company, the railcar maker founded in 1887 in St. Louis

References

Defunct rolling stock manufacturers of the United States
Horsecar manufacturers
Tram manufacturers
Manufacturing companies based in St. Louis
Vehicle manufacturing companies established in 1875
1875 establishments in Missouri
Electric vehicle manufacturers of the United States
J. G. Brill Company